Lawrence Bernard Gales (March 25, 1936 – September 12, 1995) was an American jazz double-bassist.

Life 
Gales began playing bass at age 11, and attended the Manhattan School of Music in the late 1950s. In that decade and the beginning of the next he worked with J.C. Heard, Eddie "Lockjaw" Davis, Johnny Griffin, Herbie Mann, Junior Mance, and Joe Williams. From 1964 to 1969 he was a member of the Thelonious Monk Quartet, where he recorded extensively and toured worldwide. After 1969, Gales relocated to Los Angeles, where he worked frequently on the local scene with Erroll Garner, Willie Bobo, Red Rodney, Sweets Edison, Benny Carter, Blue Mitchell, Clark Terry, and Kenny Burrell. He also recorded with Buddy Tate, Bennie Green, Sonny Stitt, Mary Lou Williams, Jimmy Smith, Sonny Criss, and Big Joe Turner, among others. His first session as a leader was released in 1990 on Candid Records; comprising one original and five Thelonious Monk tunes, the album was entitled A Message From Monk.

He died of leukemia in 1995, aged 59.

Discography

As leader
A Message from Monk (Candid, 1990)

As sideman
With Kenny Burrell
When Lights Are Low (Concord Jazz, 1978)
Kenny Burrell Live at the Village Vanguard (Muse, 1978 [1980])
Kenny Burrell in New York (Muse, 1978 [1981])
With Sonny Criss
Crisscraft (Muse, 1975)
Out of Nowhere (Muse, 1976)
With Bennie Green
Glidin' Along (Jazzland, 1961)
With Eddie "Lockjaw" Davis
Afro-Jaws (Riverside, 1960)
With Johnny Griffin
Tough Tenors (Jazzland, 1960) - with Eddie "Lockjaw" Davis
The First Set (Prestige, 1961) - with Eddie "Lockjaw" Davis
The Tenor Scene (Prestige, 1961) - with Eddie "Lockjaw" Davis
The Late Show (Prestige, 1961) - with Eddie "Lockjaw" Davis
The Midnight Show (Prestige, 1961) - with Eddie "Lockjaw" Davis
Lookin' at Monk! (Jazzland, 1961) - with Eddie "Lockjaw" Davis
Change of Pace (Riverside, 1961)
Blues Up & Down (Jazzland, 1961) - with Eddie "Lockjaw" Davis
With Eddie Henderson
The Real Electrifying Eddie Harris (Mutt & Jeff, 1982)
With Johnny Lytle
Swingin' at the Gate (Pacific Jazz, 1967)
With Junior Mance
Junior Mance Trio at the Village Vanguard (Jazzland, 1961)
With Thelonious Monk
Monk (Columbia, 1964)
Live at the It Club (Columbia, 1964)
Live at the Jazz Workshop (Columbia, 1964)
Straight, No Chaser (Columbia, 1966)
Underground (Columbia, 1968)
Palo Alto (Impulse!, 2020).
With Charlie Rouse
Bossa Nova Bacchanal (Blue Note, 1962)
With Sonny Stitt
Stitt Goes Latin (Roost, 1963)
Forecast: Sonny & Red (Catalyst, 1976) with Red Holloway
With Buddy Tate
Tate-a-Tate (Swingville, 1960) with Clark Terry
With Eddie "Cleanhead" Vinson
The "Clean" Machine (Muse, 1978)

References

1936 births
1995 deaths
American jazz double-bassists
Male double-bassists
Candid Records artists
20th-century American musicians
20th-century double-bassists
20th-century American male musicians
American male jazz musicians